The BC Centre for Disease Control is the public health arm for British Columbia's Provincial Health Services Authority.

It is located at 655 West 12th Avenue, Vancouver, BC. The BC Centre for Disease Control (BCCDC) provides provincial and national leadership in public health through surveillance, detection, treatment, prevention and consultation services. The Centre has tuberculosis and sexually transmitted infections (STI) clinics as well as outreach clinics in high prevalence areas throughout BC. It also provides analytical and policy support to all levels of government and health authorities. It is linked to the University of British Columbia for research and teaching. The BCCDC is the centralized purchaser of all non-travel vaccines for the Province, is responsible for Provincial environmental health issues and carries out both public health and medical sciences research.

Organizational service lines
 Clinical Prevention Services (CPS)
 Communicable Diseases and Immunization Services (CDIS)
 Environmental Health Services (EHS)

Partnerships
The BCCDC maintains partnerships with organizations throughout Canada, including regional health authorities, the Government of British Columbia, the University of British Columbia, Simon Fraser University, the Public Health Agency of Canada, Health Canada, BC Communicable Disease Policy Advisory Committee, and the BC environmental Health Policy Committee.

Foundation 
The BCCDC Foundation for Public Health is the charitable partner of the BCCDC, engaging donors and partners to raise funds for initiatives to address issues such as vaccine uptake, environmental health risks and communicable diseases. The foundation accepts donations from members of the public, government agencies, philanthropic organizations and the health care and pharmaceutical industries. Funds are allocated to broad or specific programs including supporting scientific research at academic institutions like the University of British Columbia, as well as agencies responding to public health emergencies such as COVID-19 and the opioid epidemic.

Donors to the foundation include:

Public health activities

COVID-19 
On April 30, 2020, the BCCDC published guidance alongside the BC Ministry of Health on interpreting the results of polymerase chain reaction (PCR) tests for detection of SARS-CoV-2, the virus that causes COVID-19.

Notable people

Jennifer Gardy, Deputy Director of Surveillance, Data and Epidemiology at the Bill & Melinda Gates Foundation
Reka Gustafson, Vice President of Public Health and Wellness at BCCDC, and Deputy Provincial Health Officer under the BC Ministry of Health
Agatha Jassem, head of the Virology Lab at British Columbia Centre for Disease Control, Public Health Laboratory
Mel Krajden, Medical Director at the British Columbia Centre for Disease Control, Public Health Laboratory

References

References
 Communicable Disease Control Manual - British Columbia Centre for Disease Control

Organizations based in Vancouver
Medical and health organizations based in British Columbia